Drillia dunkeri is a species of sea snail, a marine gastropod mollusk in the family Drilliidae.

The homonym Drillia dunkeri Knudsen, 1952 is a synonym of Drillia knudseni Tippett, 2006

Description
The length of the shell attains 31 mm.

Distribution
This species occurs in the demersal zone of the Atlantic Ocean off West Africa.

References

 Weinkauff, H.C. & Kobelt, W. (1875–1887) Die Familie Pleurotomidae. Systematisches Conchylien-Cabinet von Martini und Chemnitz. Vol. 4. Bauer & Raspe, Nürnberg, 248 pp., pls. A, 1–42.
  Tucker, J.K. 2004 Catalog of recent and fossil turrids (Mollusca: Gastropoda). Zootaxa 682:1–1295
 Tippett D.L. (2006a) Taxonomic notes on some Indo-Pacific and West African Drillia species (Conoidea: Drillidae). Iberus, 24, 13-21-page(s): 14-17

External links

dunkeri
Gastropods described in 1876